The PostClassical Ensemble is a classical music musical ensemble from Washington, D.C. The organization was founded by conductor Angel Gil-Ordoñez and music historian Joseph Horowitz in 2003.

History
For the first period of its history, the PCE performed in a variety of locations in the Washington, D.C. area. The ensemble debuted in 2005 with a performance of “Celebrating Don Quixote,” featuring a commissioned production of Manuel de Falla’s puppet opera Master Peter’s Puppet Show, along with rarely heard works by Oscar Espla and Roberto Gerhard. In the 2000s, the ensemble received a $200,000 grant from the Andrew W. Mellon Foundation.

In 2016, PCE's presentation of three American documentaries;  “The Plow that Broke the Plains,” “The River,” and “The City,” with original scores by Virgil Thomson generated two Naxos DVDs. Its release of a newly recorded score for the Mexican docu-film Redes received a strongly positive view from the Los Angeles Times, and its festival honoring the works of Bernard Hermann was praised by several U.S. music critics for highlighting Hermann's works.

Activities
PostClassical Ensemble's repertoire emphasizes music composed after 1900, producing the work of artists such as Lou Harrison, Bernard Hermann, and Silvestre Revueltas.

PCE has collaborated with such artists as pianists Jeremy Denk, Benjamin Pasternak, Alexander Toradze,  William Wolfram, clarinetist David Krakauer, baritones Christòpheren Nomura and William Sharp, bass-baritone Kevin Deas, pipa virtuoso Min Xiao-fen, and other internationally prominent artists.

The group is also an artistic partner of Georgetown University as well as an educational partner of the National Gallery of Art.

Music directors
 Angel Gil-Ordoñez 2003–Present

See also

 Angel Gil-Ordoñez 
 Joseph Horowitz

References

External links
PostClassical Ensemble Official site

Wikipedia requested audio of orchestras
Arts organizations established in 2003
American orchestras
Musical groups from Washington, D.C.
Musical groups established in 2003
Performing arts in Washington, D.C.